Mohammed Aziz Djellouli (born Tunis, December 14, 1896 - died Radès, 1975) was a Tunisian politician and businessman. He served for a time as chairman of the Red Crescent in Tunisia, and an administrator of the Central Bank of Tunisia under Hédi Nouira.

Personal life
Djellouli was born into a wealthy family of Arab origin; his father, Taïeb Djellouli, served as the Prime Minister of Tunisia from 1915 until 1922 and his mother was from a notable family of Turkish origin.

References

Mohamed El Aziz Ben Achour, Catégories de la société tunisoise dans la deuxième moitié du XIXe siècle, éd. Institut national d'archéologie et d'art, Tunis, 1989, pp. 195–197

1896 births
1975 deaths
Tunisian people of Turkish descent
People from Tunis
20th-century Tunisian politicians
20th-century Tunisian businesspeople